Sholem Shtern (c.1907 – August 1990) was a Canadian Yiddish poet, novelist, and critic, best known for his novels in verse depicting the life of Jewish immigrants in Canada.

Shtern was born in 1906 or 1907 in Tishevitz, Poland, and immigrated to Canada in 1927. He was a member of a prominent Yiddish literary family in Montreal, and became associated with the radical movement. His collections of poetry include Nuntkejt (Toronto, 1929) and In der Fri (Montreal, 1945), and his novels include such works as In Canada (Montreal, 1960–63), a two-volume novel in Yiddish verse.

References

1900s births
1990 deaths
Jewish poets
Jewish novelists
Jewish Canadian writers
Writers from Montreal
People from Tomaszów Lubelski County
Yiddish-language poets
Yiddish culture in Canada
Polish emigrants to Canada